"Down Under" is a song recorded by Australian rock band Men at Work. It was originally released in 1980 as the B-side to their first local single, "Keypunch Operator", released before the band signed with Columbia Records. Both early songs were written by the group's co-founders, Colin Hay and Ron Strykert. The early version of "Down Under" has a slightly different tempo and arrangement from the later Columbia release. The best-known version was then released on Columbia in 1981 as the second single from their debut album Business as Usual (1981).

The hit song went to number one in their home country Australia in December 1981, and then topped the New Zealand charts in February 1982. The song topped the Canadian charts in October 1982. In the United States, the song debuted on the Billboard Hot 100 on 6 November 1982 at No. 79, and reached No. 1 in January 1983. Topping the US Billboard chart for four non-consecutive weeks, it eventually sold over two million copies in the US alone. Billboard ranked it at No. 4 for 1983.

In the UK, the song topped the charts in January and February 1983: the only Men at Work song to make the UK top 20. The song also went to No. 1 in Denmark, Ireland, Italy and Switzerland, and was a top 10 hit in many other countries. "Down Under" is perceived as a patriotic song in Australia; it remains popular and is often played at sporting events.

In January 2018, as part of Triple M's "Ozzest 100", the 'most Australian' songs of all time so far, "Down Under" was ranked number 2 behind Cold Chisel's "Khe Sanh".

Lyric
The lyric to "Down Under" depicts an Australian man travelling the globe, meeting people who are interested in his home country. The story is based in part on singer Colin Hay's own travels abroad, including a prominent reference to a Vegemite sandwich (a popular snack in Australia), which derived from an encounter with a tall baker from Brussels who emigrated from Brunswick, Melbourne. Hay has said the lyric was partly inspired by Barry Humphries' character Barry McKenzie, a comically stereotypical Australian who tours abroad.

Slang and drug terms are featured in the lyric. It opens with the singer travelling in a fried-out Kombi, on a hippie trail, head full of zombie. In Australian slang, "fried-out" means that it's in really poor condition and overheating, "Kombi" is short for "Kombinationskraftwagen" and refers to the Volkswagen Type 2, and "full of zombie" refers to the use of a type of marijuana. "Hippie trail" refers to a subcultural tourist route popular in the 1960s and 1970s which stretched from Western Europe to South-East Asia. The song also contains the refrain where beer does flow and men chunder. To "chunder" means to vomit.

Speaking to Songfacts about the overall meaning of the lyric, Hay remarked:

The promotional video comically plays out the events of the lyric, showing Hay and other band members riding in a Volkswagen Kombi van, eating muesli with a 'strange lady', eating and drinking in a café, and lying in an opium den. The band are moved along at one point by a man in a shirt and tie who places a 'Sold' sign in the ground. Exterior shots were filmed at the Cronulla sand dunes in Sydney. The band are seen carrying a coffin across the dunes at the end. This, Hay has explained, was a warning to his fellow Australians that their country's identity was dying as a result of overdevelopment and Americanization. Hay has also stated that the same ominous sentiment lies behind the choral line, Can't you hear that thunder? You'd better run; you'd better take cover.

Reception
Billboard called it a "tongue-in-cheek story song that relies on percussion and vocals more than sax."

Cultural significance
The song is a perennial favourite on Australian radio and television, and topped the charts in the US and UK simultaneously in early 1983. It was later used as a theme song by the crew of Australia II in their successful bid to win the America's Cup in 1983, and a remixed version appears during the closing credits of Crocodile Dundee in Los Angeles. Men at Work played this song in the closing ceremony of the 2000 Summer Olympics in Sydney, alongside other Australian artists.

In May 2001, Australasian Performing Right Association (APRA) celebrated its 75th anniversary by naming the Best Australian Songs from 1926 to 2001, as decided by a hundred-strong industry panel. "Down Under" was ranked as the fourth song on the list.

The song was ranked number 96 on VH1's "100 Greatest Songs of the 1980s" in October 2006.

"Down Under" was added to the National Film and Sound Archive's Sounds of Australia registry in 2007.

Australian mixed martial artist and UFC Featherweight Champion Alexander Volkanovski has used the song as his entrance music for all of his fights since 2020.

Copyright lawsuit

In 2007, on the ABC-TV quiz show Spicks and Specks the question was posed "What children's song is contained in the song 'Down Under'?" The answer, "Kookaburra", a song whose rights were owned by Larrikin Music, resulted in phone calls and emails to Larrikin the next day. Larrikin Music subsequently decided to take legal action against Hay and Strykert, the song's writers.

Sections of the flute part of the recording of the song were found to be based on "Kookaburra", written in 1932 by Marion Sinclair. In fact, producer Peter McIan remembered the inclusion of the melody being a "musical joke" by flautist Greg Ham – he can even be seen sitting on a gum tree in the song's music video while playing the riff. Sinclair died in 1988 and the rights to "Kookaburra" were deemed to have been transferred to publisher Larrikin Music on 21 March 1990. In the United States, the rights are administered by Music Sales Corporation in New York City.

In June 2009, 28 years after the release of the recording, Larrikin Music sued Men at Work for copyright infringement, alleging that part of the flute riff of "Down Under" was copied from "Kookaburra". The counsel for the band's record label and publishing company (Sony BMG Music Entertainment and EMI Songs Australia) claimed that, based on the agreement under which the song was written, the copyright was actually held by the Girl Guides Association. On 30 July, Justice Peter Jacobson of the Federal Court of Australia made a preliminary ruling that Larrikin did own copyright on the song, but the issue of whether or not Hay and Strykert had plagiarised the riff was set aside to be determined at a later date.

On 4 February 2010, Jacobson ruled that Larrikin's copyright had been infringed because "Down Under" reproduced "a substantial part of 'Kookaburra'".

When asked how much Larrikin would be seeking in damages, Larrikin's lawyer Adam Simpson replied: "anything from what we've claimed, which is between 40 and 60 per cent, and what they suggest, which is considerably less." In court, Larrikin's principal Norman Lurie gave the opinion that, had the parties negotiated a licence at the outset as willing parties, the royalties would have been between 25 and 50 per cent. On 6 July 2010, Jacobson handed down a decision that Larrikin receive 5% of royalties from 2002. In October 2011, the band lost its final court bid when the High Court of Australia refused to hear an appeal.

Until this high-profile case, the standing of "Kookaburra" as a traditional song combined with the lack of visible policing of the song's rights by its composer had led to the general public perception that the song was within the public domain.

The revelation of "Kookaburra"'s copyright status, and more so the pursuit of royalties from it, has generated a negative response among sections of the Australian public. In response to unsourced speculation of a Welsh connection, Rhidian Griffiths pointed out that the Welsh words to the tune were published in 1989, and musicologist Phyllis Kinney stated neither the song's metre nor its lines were typical Welsh.

Colin Hay has since suggested that the deaths of his father, Jim, in 2010, and of Men at Work flute player Greg Ham in 2012 were directly linked to the stress of the court case.

Track listing

7": CBS / BA 222891 Australia
"Down Under" – 3:44
"Crazy" – 2:34

7": CBS / A 2066 Europe
"Down Under" – 3:44
"Helpless Automaton" – 3:23

7": CBS / 43.539 Brazil
"Down Under" – 3:44
"Who Can It Be Now?" – 3:21

12": CBS / BA 12229 Australia / Promo-release 1986
"Down Under (Extended mix)" – 5:30
"Sail to you (Extended mix)" – 5:48

7": Columbia / 38-03303 USA
"Down Under" – 3:44
"Crazy" – 2:34

Charts

Weekly charts

Year-end charts

Certifications and sales

Colin Hay versions
A new version of the song was produced by Colin Hay, coinciding with the thirtieth anniversary of the original's release. Requested by Telstra for use in an Australian advertising campaign during the 2012 Summer Olympics period, the song was available through iTunes on 31 July 2012.

In the new version, Hay intentionally changed the flute part that caused the copyright lawsuit.

Luude featuring Colin Hay

In 2021, Australian producer Luude (real name Christian Benson, from the Tasmanian tech house dance duo Choomba), remixed "Down Under" as a drum and bass track on the Sweat It Out record label, credited to Luude featuring Colin Hay. In January 2022, the drum and bass version of "Down Under" debuted at number 32 on the Official UK Singles Chart Top 40 and at number 48 in Australia. The single climbing into both country's Top 10 a month later. In New Zealand, the record climbed to number one on the Official Singles Chart, and by 6 February 2022 had spent four weeks at number one. On 22 January 2022, the Luude version of "Down Under" was ranked at number 65 on the Triple J Hottest 100, 2021.

At the 2022 ARIA Music Awards, the song was nominated for Song of the Year, Best Dance/Electronic Release and Best Video and Luude was nominated for Michael Gudinski Breakthrough Artist.

Weekly charts

Year-end charts

Certifications

See also
List of number-one singles in Australia during the 1980s
List of Billboard Hot 100 number-one singles of 1983
List of Billboard Mainstream Rock number-one songs of the 1980s
List of Cash Box Top 100 number-one singles of 1983
List of number-one singles of 1982 (Canada)
List of number-one singles of 1983 (Ireland)
List of number-one singles from the 1980s (New Zealand)
List of number-one singles of the 1980s (Switzerland)
List of UK Singles Chart number ones of the 1980s
List of UK Independent Singles Chart number ones of 2022

References

External links
Lyrics of the song

1981 singles
1981 songs
1982 singles
Men at Work songs
APRA Award winners
Australian patriotic songs
Billboard Hot 100 number-one singles
Cashbox number-one singles
Columbia Records singles
Luude songs
Irish Singles Chart number-one singles
Number-one singles in Australia
Number-one singles in New Zealand
Number-one singles in Switzerland
RPM Top Singles number-one singles
Songs about Australia
Songs based on children's songs
Songs involved in plagiarism controversies
Songs involved in royalties controversies
Songs written by Colin Hay
UK Singles Chart number-one singles